In 2007 the United Nations General Assembly resolved to observe 15 September as the International Day of Democracywith the purpose of promoting and upholding the principles of democracyand invited all member states and organizations to commemorate the day in an appropriate manner that contributes to raising public awareness.

Background 
In September 1997 the Inter-Parliamentary Union (IPU) adopted a Universal Declaration on Democracy. That Declaration affirms the principles of democracy, the elements and exercise of democratic government, and the international scope of democracy.

The international conferences on new and restored democracies (ICNRD process) began in 1988 under the initiative of President Corazon C. Aquino of the Philippines after the so-called peaceful "People Power Revolution" overthrew the 20-year dictatorship of Ferdinand Marcos. Initially an inter-governmental forum, the ICNRD process developed into a tripartite structure with participation of governments, parliaments and civil society. The sixth conference (ICNRD-6) that took place in Doha, Qatar, in 2006 reinforced the tripartite nature of the process and concluded with a declaration and Plan of Action which reaffirmed the fundamental principles and values of democracy.

Following up on the outcome of ICNRD-6, an advisory board set up by the chair of the process, Qatar, decided to promote an International Day of Democracy. Qatar took the lead in drafting the text of a United Nations General Assembly resolution and convened consultations with UN member states. At the suggestion of the IPU, on 15 September (date of the Universal Declaration on Democracy) was chosen as the day when the international community would celebrate each year the International Day of Democracy.  The resolution, titled "Support by the United Nations system of efforts of Governments to promote and consolidate new or restored democracies," was adopted by consensus on 8 November 2007.

History

2008 
The IPU has urged parliaments to celebrate the International Day of Democracy through some form of special activity, to be held on or as close to 15 September as possible depending on circumstances. The day will be an opportunity for parliaments to: 
 Emphasize the importance of democracy, what it involves, the challenges it faces as well as the opportunities it offers, and the central responsibility that all parliaments have as the key institution of democracy;
 Examine and discuss how well parliament performs its democratic functions, possibly on the basis of a self-assessment, and identify what steps it may take to strengthen its effectiveness.

To mark the first International Day of Democracy on 15 September 2008, the IPU will hold a special event at the House of Parliaments in Geneva. National parliaments are invited to organise their own democracy-related activities on that day to highlight the role of parliament as the cornerstone of democracy .

2009 
The theme for 2009 was "Democracy and political tolerance". At the U.N. Headquarters there was a speech by the Secretary-General and a screening of the documentary film Please Vote for Me.

2013 
In 2013, IPU promoted the International Day of Democracy through its Member Parliaments in 162 countries around the world. As a result, a number of parliaments from all over the globe announced their events to be held on or close to 15 September.

The year's theme was "Strengthening Voices for Democracy" and IPU launched an online contest to hear and gather stories from local democracy champions that managed to make their voices heard. These stories were to inspire people to take action in their own community.

2014 
The theme for the International Day of Democracy in 2014 is "Engaging youth on democracy".

IPU has urged action and changes in mindset if disillusioned and alienated youth the world over are to be engaged in political decision-making.

In its press release, IPU President Abdelwahad Radi said, "It is a cliché to always link youth to the future. Young people not only have the power to define the future, but also decide on the present. However, they are largely absent from formal decision-making politics and this has to change".

The IPU says youth participation has a special meaning for it and that a programme to promote young men and women’s involvement in the democratic process is getting underway, in follow-up to the resolution adopted by the IPU Assembly in 2010. The IPU announced it would organize the first Global Conference of Young Parliamentarians on 10 and 11 October 2014 and all parliaments were invited to attend.

A photo contest titled "Engage for Change" encourages youth to show what action they take to bring about positive change in society by sending a photo that shows them working for positive change in their community, region, country or the world.

2015 
The theme for 2015 was "Space for Civil Society".

2016 

The theme for 2016 was Democracy and the 2030 agenda for sustainable development.

2017 

The theme for 2017 was "Democracy and Conflict Prevention".

2018 

The theme for 2018's observance was "Democracy under Strain: Solutions for a Changing World". Coinciding with the 70th anniversary of the Universal Declaration of Human Rights, the Day is also an opportunity to highlight the values of freedom and respect for human rights as essential elements of democracy.

2019 

The 2019 theme for democracy day was "participation".

"This year's International Day of Democracy is an opportunity to recall that democracy is about people. Democracy is built on inclusion, equal treatment and participation—and it is a fundamental building block for peace, sustainable development, and human rights."

2020 
The theme for International Day of Democracy 2020 was "COVID-19: A Spotlight on Democracy".

2021 
The theme for International Day of Democracy 2021 was "Strengthening democratic resilience in the face of future crises".

2022 
The theme for International Day of Democracy 2022 is "Protecting Press Freedom for Democracy".

See also 
 Democracy Day in other countries
 Parliament Week (United Kingdom)

References

External links 
 This year's events - UN Website
 International Day of Democracy, 15 September

September observances
Democracy, International Day of